Aliabad-e Olya (also Romanized as ‘Alīābād-e ‘Olyā; also known as ‘Alīābād-e Bālā) is a village in Mahidasht Rural District, Mahidasht District, Kermanshah County, Kermanshah Province, Iran. At the 2006 census, its population was 29, in 8 families.

References 

Populated places in Kermanshah County